Rune Lange (born 24 June 1977) is a Norwegian former professional footballer who played as a striker.

Career
Lange hails from the city of Tromsø and joined the club Fløya at the age of five. As a 17-year-old, he became top scorer in the 3. divisjon (fourth tier) with 33 goals in 22 matches, and then moved on to play for Tromsdalen in the 1. divisjon (2nd tier). Lange stayed with the club for three seasons, during which he experienced a relegation and a season in the 2. divisjon (3rd tier).

During the summer of 1997, Lange signed for Tromsø, which played in the Tippeligaen (first tier). He scored seven goals in 11 matches for Tromsø during his first season, and nearly experienced another relegation, but Tromsø survived after having to play qualification matches. Lange also debuted for the Norway under-20 football team. In 1998, Lange scored 20 goals in 26 matches, and was almost sold to Coventry City. Lange stayed at Tromsø, however, as he could not come to an agreement with Coventry on the contract details. In 1999, Lange become top scorer of the Norwegian top division, scoring 23 goals. Lange also made his debut for the Norway U21s that season.

In 2000, Lange started as a player for Tromsø, but was sold to the Turkish side Trabzonspor in July. Lange only played 14 matches and scored seven goals in Turkey. 

In April 2001 he moved to Belgian side Club Brugge, the team where he played until 2006.

In 2004, Lange debuted for the Norway national team, playing against Wales.

In February 2009, Lange signed for Hartlepool United on a contract until the end of the 2008-09 season. In his third game for Hartlepool, his shoulder was dislocated. On 13 March 2009, Lange had surgery on his injured shoulder and was scheduled not to return to training for at least six weeks.

In September 2009 he signed for Kvik Halden (in the fourth tier of Norwegian football) until the remainder of the season, making four appearances (two league games and both play-off games).

As of March 2011 he was working as a scout for his former employer, Club Brugge.

Career statistics

Honours
Club Brugge
 Belgian First Division: 2002–03, 2004–05
 Belgian Cup: 2001–02, 2003–04
 Belgian Supercup: 2002, 2003, 2004, 2005

References

External links

Living people
1977 births
Kniksen Award winners
Norwegian footballers
Association football forwards
Norway international footballers
Norway under-21 international footballers
Norway youth international footballers
Eliteserien players
Norwegian First Division players
Belgian Pro League players
Süper Lig players
English Football League players
Tromsdalen UIL players
Tromsø IL players
Club Brugge KV players
Trabzonspor footballers
Sportspeople from Tromsø
Vålerenga Fotball players
Hartlepool United F.C. players
Kvik Halden FK players
Norwegian Second Division players
Norwegian Third Division players
Norwegian expatriate footballers
Expatriate footballers in Turkey
Norwegian expatriate sportspeople in Turkey
Expatriate footballers in England
Norwegian expatriate sportspeople in England
Expatriate footballers in Belgium
Norwegian expatriate sportspeople in Belgium